Jassar  is a town in the Narowal District of Punjab Province, Pakistan. Jassar is also a caste from jatt clan which stay in Punjab province,Pakistan which basically belongs to Ludhiana, indian. In Pakistan they are Muslim community and in India jassar are Sikh sardar community.

Geography
The town is located at 32°6'0N 74°57'0E

References

External links
 News of Narowal, Sahkargarh, Zafarwal and other towns, villages.www.barapind.co.cc
Bara Pind's official web site : www.barapind.co.cc

Populated places in Narowal District
Narowal District